Nalón Club de Fútbol is a Spanish football club based in the parish of Olloniego, in Oviedo, Asturias. Founded in 1996, the team plays in Regional Preferente – Group 2. The club's home ground is Fumea-Lolo Rodríguez, which has a capacity of 300 spectators.

History
The first club in Olloniego was Club Nalón, founded on 24 June 1957. Years later, after the dissolution of this club, the new Nalón CF was created in 1996.

In 2008 the club promoted for the first time in its history to Tercera División, but was immediately relegated despite earning a draw against regional powerhouse Real Oviedo at Estadio Carlos Tartiere. Only one year later, Nalón promoted again to the fourth tier and played in it two more years before coming back to Regional Preferente.

Season to season

3 seasons in Tercera División

External links
Official website 
Futbolme.com profile 

Football clubs in Asturias
Association football clubs established in 1958
Divisiones Regionales de Fútbol clubs
1958 establishments in Spain